An interstitial space or interstice is a space between structures or objects.   
In particular, interstitial may refer to:

Biology
 Interstitial cell tumor
 Interstitial cell, any cell that lies between other cells
 Interstitial collagenase, enzyme that breaks the peptide bonds in collagen
 Interstitial cystitis
 Interstitium, the contiguous fluid-filled space existing between the skin and body organs
 Interstitial fluid, a solution that bathes and surrounds the cells of multicellular animals
 Interstitial granulomatous dermatitis
 Interstitial infusion
 Interstitial keratitis
 Interstitial lung disease
 Interstitial nephritis
 Interstitial pregnancy

Other uses
To describe the spaces within particulate matter such sands, gravels, cobbles, grain, etc. that lie between the discrete particles. 

 Interstitial art
 Interstitial condensation, in construction
 Interstitial site, in chemistry
 Interstitial defect, in chemistry
 Interstitial television show, in television programming
 Interstitial revolution, in politics
 Interstitial space (architecture)
 Interstitial webpage, in computing
 Interstices (Catholicism)

See also